William Arthur Purnell F.R.A.I.A. (5 January 1878 – 29 June 1964), generally known as Arthur Purnell, and sometimes A W Purnell, was an Australian born architect who practiced in Canton, China in the 1900s, and from 1910 mainly in Melbourne, Australia. He is most noted for the few designs in Melbourne that include Chinese references.

Early history
Arthur Purnell was born in 1878 the eldest son of William Purnell, jun., and his wife Emily, née Keown of Geelong, Victoria. He was educated at McManus Preparatory School, Flinders State School, Geelong College, then studied architecture at Gordon Technical College, and drawing at the Geelong School of Arts. His father and grandfather were partners in Purnell & Sons, builders, and Arthur joined the firm as a draftsman in 1895, then took further studies under C. A. Heyward, a government architect.

The China years
In 1900 Purnell left for China, and established himself in Canton (modern Guangzhou) in 1903. In 1904 he teamed up with Charles Souders Paget (1874–1933), a civil engineer from Bethlehem, Pennsylvania, as Purnell & Paget, winning the competition for a new Customs House the same year, and they soon developed a busy practice. They designed numerous projects, including large buildings for the Chinese Imperial Post Office, the London Missionary Society, the Canton Christian College, the Southern Baptist Theological School, and a power station for China Light & Power, which have all been demolished as Guangzhou has been redeveloped in recent years.

The former British and French concession Shamian Island (then known as Shameen) however is completely intact, and hosts a number of designs by the firm, as well as alterations such as extra floors. They include the Imperial Maritime Customs Building (eastern end of Central Shamian Street on the north side, with a pair of 'witches hat' towers, 1907), Griffith & Co (south west corner of North Shamian and Third Streets, c1905), Karberg & Co, (50 South Shamian Street, 1908), International Banking Co (end of Central Shamian on the north side, 1908), Deacon & Co (northwest corner of Central Shamian and Fifth, 1908). All of the designs were generally in the Far East British Colonial form known as 'compradoric', featuring multi-level verandahs supported on solid pillars or arches, with Italianate or Edwardian Baroque detailing.

One of his designs outside Shamian to survive is the South China Cement Factory built in 1909, which was later used by Chinese Nationalist leader Sun Yat-sen as his home and headquarters from 1917 to 1923, and is now a museum.

He returned briefly to Melbourne in 1908 to marry Jane Farrell. Her parents were pastoralists from Lake Monemia near Streatham, Victoria. He returned to Canton with his new wife and a pet Kangaroo and joey, as seen in a photo from 1908.

Return to Melbourne

Purnell returned to Melbourne in 1910, and set up office in the Nicholson Chambers at 101 Swanston Street, and later Phair's Buildings at 327 Collins Street.

A notable design of this time was Michael's Corner, built in 1915, which still stands on the south west corner of Elizabeth and Lonsdale Streets.

During this time and into the 1920s he did many designs for people and businesses of Chinese origin, while a few designs of his own contained elements of Chinese design, or featured Chinese names. For instance he designed a warehouse in Melbourne's Chinatown in Punch Lane off Little Bourke Street in 1911 for cabinetmaker Tye Shing (demolished). His own house of 1916 (demolished) was an early example of the Bungalow style, with exaggerated verandah piers and projecting chimney pots with a slightly Oriental character, which he named Shameen in a clear reference to this time in China.

Clearer use of Chinese design motifs can be seen an unbuilt tearoom design for Malvern in 1913 which featured a distinctly Oriental roof and verandah, followed by  ‘Tsohshaan Mansions’ (‘tsohshaan’ is supposedly Cantonese for ‘house upon the hill’), at the corner of Malvern and Irving Roads Toorak, built 1917, which has an Oriental feel achieved without overt Chinese elements. In 1928 he designed another teahouse, at 22 Newcombe Street Portarlington (demolished), which featured a distinctly Chinese roof shape.

His most well known Chinese influenced design, and possibly the best known of all his works, is his own house, located on a busy city artery, at 492 Punt Road South Yarra. This is a substantial reworking of a house he had designed for his client "Alec" Barlow in 1924, which he bought and named Shan Teng, adding a number of rooms, changing the orientation, and in particular the roof, which he changed just before construction from a simple hipped roof to one with a curved Chinese shape. His daughter recalled that the family had Chinese servants indentured from an American ships captain.

Beaver and Purnell

In 1915 he joined with Isidor Beaver at his practice at Altson's Buildings, 82 Elizabeth Street, Melbourne, on the Collins Street corner. Beaver was a Manchester-born architect who had been in partnership with Edmund Wright in Adelaide and moved to Melbourne in 1890 to supervise construction of their National Mutual Life building on the corner of Collins Street and Queen Street.

A notable project by the firm was the well known St. Moritz Ice-skating Palais, a 1939 conversion of their 1922 Wattle Path Palais de Danse, a large arched roofed dance hall on the Esplanade at St. Kilda, controversially demolished in 1982.

Purnell left the partnership in 1925; Beaver, 19 years his senior, died in 1934.

Project include :

 Ranmoor, 395 Glenferrie Road, Malvern (1916, demolished)
 Wattle Path Palais, St Kilda (1922)
 Carinya, 61 Clendon Road, Toorak (1925)

After Beaver

Purnell moved to offices in the Equitable Building at 314 Collins Street. In 1928 he briefly formed a partnership with Eric Hazel Round and William Alfred Graham as Arthur W. Purnell, Round & Graham, which only lasted only a year, and he went into solo practice again. In 1935 that he formed A. W. Purnell & Pearce, with Phillip Foster Pearce A.R.A.I.A., still at the same address. By the time Pearce retired in 1946, their offices were at the Colonial Mutual Life building in Collins Street, the same building by a different name.

As well as a great number of private residences in a multitude of styles, works produced during this time include a wide range of commercial projects, mostly now demolished:
Clifton Springs Golf Club (1926)
A greyhound-racing track at Tottenham (1927, demolished)
Regent Theatre, Ballarat, with Cedric Ballantyne (1927)
A grandstand at Western Oval (now Whitten Oval) (1929, extensively altered)
Woolstore No 2, Younghusband Woolstore, Kensington (1928 + 1932)
Cyclone House, Hardware Street, Melbourne (1930)
Patersons Furniture Store, 152 Bourke Street (1934)
Younghusband Woolstore, Albury (1936, demolished)
The Olympia Sea Water Swimming Pool at South Melbourne (1937, demolished)
Southern Stand, Melbourne Cricket Ground (1937, demolished)
The Rosebud Yacht Club (1939, demolished)
Glaciarium, South Melbourne, interior remodelling (1939, demolished)
Avonmore Lodge (maisonettes), Toorak Road, cnr Glenferrie Road, Toorak, 1940
The Olympic Stand at the Melbourne Cricket Ground (1953–1955, demolished).

In the 1920s Purnell had a close working relationship with car dealer Alexander George "Alec" Barlow (1880–1937), for whom he built a home, car showrooms and racing stables. Purnell's own house on Punt Road was a reworking of an earlier house he had designed for Barlow, who had to sell up.

Family
William Arthur Purnell married Jane (aka Ginnie) Farrell, near Streatham, Victoria in 1908; Ginnie died on 25 October 1966. The hot humid climate of Southern China did not suit Ginnie and may have been the reason they returned to Australia in 1910. Their only child, a daughter Joan, was born in 1918, ten years after their marriage. In 1923 they divorced, but three years later they remarried. Joan Margaret Purnell married Noel William Dickson in 1939, and died in 2002.

Further reading 

 Groves, Derham, From Canton Club to Melbourne Cricket Club:The Architecture of Arthur Purnell, Exhibition Catalogue, Melbourne University, 2006.
 Melbourne University Archives has several thousand drawings, correspondence etc. Archives Catalogue entry here.
 Culture Victoria entry for Arthur Purnell found here.

References 

Garton Family Book 2018
The Argus 29 November 1923

Architects from Melbourne
1878 births
1964 deaths
Australian expatriates in China